Lieutenant-Colonel Sir Walter Edgeworth-Johnstone   (24 June 1863 – 4 January 1936) was an Irish sportsman and police official. He was the Amateur Boxing Association of England 1895 and 1896 heavyweight title. He was Chief Commissioner of the Dublin Metropolitan Police from 1915 to 1923.

Life
He was born Walter Johnston in 1863 in Kingstown (now Dún Laoghaire), County Dublin, Ireland. He later changed his name by deed poll to Edgeworth-Johnstone. In 1895 and 1896 he was Amateur Boxing Association of England heavyweight champion. He was also an excellent footballer and cricket player, and won numerous titles in fencing, including the sabre title at the 1898 and 1900 British Fencing Championships.

He was commissioned a lieutenant in the Royal Irish Regiment on 25 August 1886, and promoted to captain on 5 April 1893. In February 1900 he was appointed to act temporarily as Assistant Inspector of Gymnasia at Aldershot. He transferred to the Curragh Camp where he was Superintendent of Gymnasia from 5 February 1901 to 30 September 1902.

Edgeworth-Johnstone was Chief Commissioner of the Dublin Metropolitan Police from 1915 to 1923. The unarmed Dublin Metropolitan Police stayed largely neutral during the Irish War of Independence.

Honours
Edgeworth-Johnstone was named a Companion of the Order of the Bath in the 1918 New Year Honours. He was invested as a Knight Commander of the Order of the British Empire in 1924, and promoted to lieutenant-colonel.

Personal life
In 1897, Edgeworth-Johnstone married Helen Gunning Walker Waters. They had two sons and two daughters. One of his sons was Robert Edgeworth-Johnstone, a chemical engineer.  He died 4 January 1936 in Regent's Park Terrace, London.

References

External links
Walter Edgeworth-Johnstone at the National Portrait Gallery
 Paper on the role of Edgeworth-Johnstone during the 1916 rising by Gregory Allen (Sep 1977)
 Profile at CricketEurope
 

Heavyweight boxers
1863 births
1936 deaths
People from Dún Laoghaire
Sportspeople from Dún Laoghaire–Rathdown
England Boxing champions
Chief Commissioners of the Dublin Metropolitan Police
Companions of the Order of the Bath
Knights Commander of the Order of the British Empire
Irish male boxers
Royal Irish Regiment (1684–1922) officers